The 2019–20 Stanford Cardinal women's basketball team represents Stanford University during the 2019–20 NCAA Division I women's basketball season. The Cardinal, led by thirty-fourth year head coach Tara VanDerveer, play their home games at the Maples Pavilion and are members of the Pac-12 Conference.

Roster

Schedule

|-
!colspan=9 style=| Exhibition

|-
!colspan=9 style=| Non-conference regular season

|-
!colspan=9 style=| Pac-12 regular season

|-
!colspan=9 style=| Pac-12 Women's Tournament

Rankings
2019–20 NCAA Division I women's basketball rankings

^Coaches did not release Week 2 poll

See also
2019–20 Stanford Cardinal men's basketball team

References

Stanford Cardinal women's basketball seasons
Stanford